Erna Hamburger (14 September 1911 – 15 May 1988) was a Swiss engineer and professor. In 1957, she became professor of electrometry at the University of Lausanne. She was the first woman in the history of Switzerland to be named a professor at a STEM university.

Early life and education 
Hamburger was born on 14 September 1911, in Brussels, Belgium to Frederick and Else Müller. She went to secondary school in Kissingen, Bavaria. She first started secondary school at an all-girls' school, and then moved on to be the only girl in her engineering classes. In 1933, Hamburger received an engineering-electrician diploma from the École Polytechnique Fédérale de Lausanne. Hamburger also received a doctorate in technical sciences from the same school in 1936.

Career 
In 1942, Hamburger was employed as an electrical engineer at Paillard SA in Sainte-Croix, Switzerland. Before becoming a professor at the University of Lausanne, Hamburger was the head of work at the electrotechnical laboratory at École Polytechnique Fédérale de Lausanne.

In 1957, Hamburger was appointed as the first woman in the history of Switzerland to be named professor at École Polytechnique Fédérale de Lausanne. When this occurred, the president of the school, Maurice Cosandey, announced, "It is both a brilliant consecration and a measure of the backwardness that characterizes our country as regards the promotion of women." 

Other positions Hamburger held include president of the Swiss Association of Women in Liberal and Commercial Careers, president of the Association of University Women of Vaud, and vice president of the International Federation of University Women.

One of her major innovations was the creation of an apparatus for radio-wave reception. This research included topics such as a system of optical registration from tone frequencies and ultra-short waves.

Hamburger joined the Swiss military in 1939 and was promoted to chief of the telecommunication troops in 1950.

Legacy 
Hamburger was an advocate for higher education. Shortly after her death, the Swiss Federal Institute of Technology in Lausanne Women in Science and Humanities Foundation was created. The primary goal of this foundation is to promote and support women in higher education. Every year, the Erna Hamburger Prize is awarded to "the most influential woman in science" that year.

References 

1911 births
1988 deaths
Academic staff of the University of Lausanne
Swiss women engineers
20th-century women engineers
Belgian emigrants to Switzerland